Coleophora wolschrijni is a moth of the family Coleophoridae. It is found in Spain.

References

wolschrijni
Moths of Europe
Moths described in 2000